The New Zealand Dairy Workers Union (NZDWU) is a national trade union in New Zealand. It represents 7,000 workers active in dairy factories, town milk supply, processing plants, stores and warehousing, packing, can-making, and other ancillary activities including drivers.

The NZDWU is affiliated with the New Zealand Council of Trade Unions, the IUF and the New Zealand Labour Party.

External links
NZDWU official site.

Dairy Workers Union
International Union of Food, Agricultural, Hotel, Restaurant, Catering, Tobacco and Allied Workers' Associations
Dairy Workers Union
Food processing trade unions